Raphael Manuvire (born 21 September 1988) is a Zimbabwean footballer who last played as a midfielder for Chapungu United and the Zimbabwe national team.

Career

Club
Manuvire began his career in 2012 with Harare City in the Zimbabwe Premier Soccer League, he remained with Harare for two years before making the move to newly promoted PSL side ZPC Kariba. Another two years passed before Manuvire was on the move again as he rejoined Harare City in 2016 on a one-year contract. On 13 February 2017, Manuvire joined ZPC Kariba for a second spell. Almost a year later, Manuvire signed for Dynamos. He terminated his Dynamos contract in July 2018, subsequently joining Chapungu United.

International
Manuvire has won six caps for the Zimbabwe national team. He scored his first international goal for Zimbabwe in a 4–1 defeat in a 2015 COSAFA Cup group stage match versus Namibia.

Career statistics

International
.

International goals
. Scores and results list Zimbabwe's goal tally first.

References

External links
 

1988 births
Living people
Zimbabwean footballers
Association football midfielders
Zimbabwe international footballers
Harare City F.C. players
ZPC Kariba F.C. players
Dynamos F.C. players
Chapungu United F.C. players
Zimbabwe A' international footballers
2016 African Nations Championship players